Indians in Peru form a tiny minority in the country and are one of the smaller populations of the Indian diaspora. According to the Indian Ministry of External Affairs, there were about 50000 Indians living in Peru as of December 2016.

History
The first immigrants from India to have arrived in Peru were businessmen who had gone there in the early 1960s. Later on, the community grew in number marginally until the early 80s, after which many of its members left due to the severe local economic crises and the prevailing terrorism. Those with relatives in other Latin American countries joined them. In recent years, the size of the community has remained stable.

There is also a small number of expatriate professionals from India in the country and a few of them have obtained Peruvian citizenship – not more than 10 out of a total number of almost forty persons.

Culture
While a few Indian cultural activities are organised, in general, the Indian community in Peru maintained a low profile. Due to the vast distance that separates the community from India, the interest in their country of origin is limited to major events, mainly derived from occasional browsing on the internet. But being invariably first generation migrants, many of them do occasionally visit India.

Most of them speak only their mother tongue and Spanish, with a smattering of English.

See also
 Hinduism in North America
 Asian Latin Americans
 Indians in Chile

References

Asian Peruvian
Ethnic groups in Peru
Peru
Peru
Indian Latin American